The 2013–14 Jackson State Tigers basketball team represented Jackson State University during the 2013–14 NCAA Division I men's basketball season. The Tigers, led by first year head coach Wayne Brent, played their home games at the Williams Assembly Center and were members of the Southwestern Athletic Conference. They finished the season 11–20, 7–11 in SWAC play to finish in seventh place. They lost in the first round of the SWAC tournament to Grambling State.

Roster

Schedule

|-
!colspan=9 style="background:#092183; color:#FFFFFF;"| Exhibition

|-
!colspan=9 style="background:#092183; color:#FFFFFF;"| Regular season

|-
!colspan=9 style="background:#092183; color:#FFFFFF;"| 2014 SWAC tournament

References

Jackson State Tigers basketball seasons
Jackson State